In soft matter physics, plumber's nightmare are structures that are characterized by fully connected, periodic, and topologically nontrivial surfaces.

The term plumber's nightmare became widely known through a publication by David A. Huse and Stanislas Leibler who attribute the name to Sol Gruner.

References

Soft matter